The 1966–67 Swedish Division I season was the 23rd season of Swedish Division I. Brynas IF won the league title by defeating Vastra Frolunda IF in the league final, 2 games to none.

Regular season

Northern Group

Southern Group

Playoffs

Quarterfinals
MoDo AIK – Djurgårdens IF 3–4, 6–3, 3–2
Södertälje SK – Leksands IF 5–3, 4–2
Brynäs IF – IFK Umeå 4–2, 4–2
Västra Frölunda IF – Mora IK 8–2, 7–4

Semifinals
Brynäs IF – MoDo AIK 6–4, 6–5
Västra Frölunda IF – Södertälje SK 2–5, 3–0, 4–2

3rd place
Södertälje SK – MoDo AIK 9–1, 7–4

Final
Brynäs IF – Västra Frölunda IF 8–4, 6–1

External links
 1966–67 season

Swedish
Swedish Division I seasons
1966–67 in Swedish ice hockey